AHSS may refer to:

 Abdul Hamid Sharaf School, private school in Amman, Jordan
 Academic health science system, type of partnership between healthcare research and provider organisations
 Advanced High Strength Steel
 Almaguin Highlands Secondary School, a high school in Ontario, Canada
 Applewood Heights Secondary School, a high school in Mississauga, Ontario, Canada
 Architectural Heritage Society of Scotland
 Atiyah–Hirzebruch spectral sequence, computational tool from homological algebra
 Amalorpavam Higher Secondary School, a high school in Pondicherry 
 American Heinrich Schütz Society, American branch of the International Heinrich Schütz Society (Internationale Heinrich-Schütz-Gesellschaft)